Temple Israel of Hollywood is a Reform Jewish synagogue in Hollywood, California founded in 1926. Services were originally held in the Hayakawa Mansion before the first Temple Israel building was established on Ivar Street under the leadership of Rabbi Isadore Isaacson. Temple Israel moved to its current location on Hollywood Boulevard in 1948. It has traditionally had a large number of film actors, writers, directors and producers as members.

Today Temple Israel is nearly 900 families strong, and includes three schools. It is led by Rabbi Mari Chernow as Senior Rabbi.

History

Temple Israel was founded in 1926 by seven men, five of whom were prominent in the film industry, including Sol M. Wurtzel, Isadore Bernstein, and Edward Laemmle. They wanted to fill the need for social services and a house of worship for the Hollywood Jewish community. A former church on Ivar Street was purchased, and served the Temple over the next two decades before the size of the congregation necessitated a larger building. The current temple was built in 1948 and has been expanded several times. It was designed by noted architects Samuel E. Lunden (designer of the Los Angeles Stock Exchange Building and interior of the St. Vincent de Paul Church) and S. Charles Lee (designer of the Hollywood Melrose Hotel and Tower Theatre). At the dedication ceremony of the temple, a small orchestra played Poem Ancien for cello and narrator by Alexander (Sasha) Borisoff. Edward G. Robinson narrated.

Shortly after its founding, the Temple began staging its Midnight Show, a fundraiser that over the years saw such stars as Benny Rubin, Lucille Ball, Al Jolson, Eddie Cantor, Jack Benny, Milton Berle, Frank Sinatra, Judy Garland, Shirley MacLaine, and Lena Horne perform on behalf of the Temple.

Rabbi Max Nussbaum was brought in to serve as Rabbi in 1943 after Rabbi Morton Bauman left his pulpit to serve in the war. Rabbi Nussbaum would remain the Rabbi for the next 32 years until his death in 1974. Cantor Saul Silverman served alongside Rabbi Nussbaum, and served the Temple for over 39 years. During Rabbi Nussbaum's tenure Temple Israel established itself as a great friend of Israel, raising large sums for the fledgling state. Many famous speakers were also brought in to speak before the congregation. Rabbi Mordechai Kaplan, Rabbi Leo Baeck, and Rabbi Stephen S. Wise all spoke from the pulpit. Harry Belafonte, Leon Uris, and Theodore Bikel also spoke before the congregation. In 1965 Martin Luther King Jr. gave a rousing speech from the bima to the congregation.

After the death of Rabbi Nussbaum, the pulpit passed to Rabbi Haskell Bernat. Cantor Aviva Rosenbloom came to the Temple at the same time and would serve as Cantor for over 30 years. After Rabbi Daniel Polish served a short term as senior Rabbi, Rabbi John Rosove was brought in to lead the Congregation in 1988 until 2019.

Danny Maseng, a prominent composer and singer, served as chazzan from 2008 to 2015.

In January 2015, the Temple celebrated the 50th Anniversary of Martin Luther King, Jr.'s visit with a celebratory evening featuring speeches from Los Angeles Mayor Eric Garcetti and talk show host and author Tavis Smiley.

In July 2021, the Temple welcome Rabbi Mari Chernow as the first female senior rabbi.

Trivia

The Temple's sanctuary lamp was donated by Hal Wallis, producer of Casablanca and True Grit.
Henry Diskay, who sang Kol Nidre in The Jazz Singer, served as cantorial soloist in the 1930s.
Rabbi Nussbaum rescued a small Torah on Kristallnacht that now resides in the Temple's Torah ark.
Tony Curtis crowned the Purim Carnival Queen in 1952.
Eddie Fisher once sang Kol Nidre on the High Holidays.
Elizabeth Taylor converted to Judaism at Temple Israel in 1959.
Marlon Brando and Bob Dylan attended Passover Seder at the Temple in 1975.
In 1996 the Temple began Chesed Day and by 1999 it was known as Mitzvah Day. Today it's called Big Sunday and is a citywide event.
In October 1957 the Temple acquired and continues to operate Hillside Memorial Park Cemetery.

Notable current and former members and congregants
Frances Bay, actress
Isadore Bernstein, screenwriter
Jack Black, actor
May Britt, actress
Steve Broidy, film executive
Eddie Cantor, singer, actor, comedian, and dancer
Sammy Davis Jr., singer and dancer
Lion Feuchtwanger, novelist
Eddie Fisher, singer
Gal Gadot, actress
Martha Hyer, actress
George Jessel, actor
Al Jolson, singer, actor, and comedian
Edward Laemmle, silent film director
Osa Massen, actress
Leonard Nimoy, actor
Amanda Peet, actress
Leon Schlesinger, film producer
David O. Selznick, film producer
Ben Stein, writer, lawyer, and actor
Elizabeth Taylor, actress
Lea Thompson, actress, television director and producer
Mike Todd, theatre and film producer
Hal Wallis, film producer
Sol Wurtzel, film producer
Roger Kumble, director and writer
Sacha Baron Cohen, comedian, actor, writer
Matthew Weiner, writer, director, television producer.

References

 The history of Temple Israel of Hollywood, 1926-1931 (1959)

External links
 Temple Israel of Hollywood

1926 establishments in California
Synagogues in Los Angeles
Jewish organizations established in 1926
Reform synagogues in California
Buildings and structures in Hollywood, Los Angeles